Granges-d'Ans is a commune in the Dordogne department in Nouvelle-Aquitaine in southwestern France. As part of the Pays d'Ans, it shares a link with the neighbouring communes of Badefols-d'Ans, La Boissière-d'Ans, Chourgnac d’Ans, Sainte-Eulalie-d'Ans and Saint-Pantaly-d'Ans.

Twin town 
Since 1999, the Granges d'Ans and its neighbouring communes in Pays d'Ans have been twinned with the Belgian town of Ans.  It is reported that in the  14th  century, the lord of Hautefort-en-Périgord, an overlord from all over the region, is said to have married one of his daughters to a Lord of Ans in Belgium (Flanders at the time).

Population 

The population of Granges d'Ans has halved since the 1960s and is substantially lower than its historical peak of over 700 in the period 1840–1890. Over 73% of the 2016 population are now over the age of 44 and 53% are female. There is also a secondary population indicated by the housing statistics that show 38% of houses are secondary or vacation homes (55% are primary residences and 7% are vacant).

Historical buildings 
 Chateau de Redon: 14th century fortified house originally owned by Teyssières family and acquired by Georges Johnston in 1818.
 Église Saint-Martin: St Martins church is a 13th-century catholic church.

River 
 Soue
 The tributary of the Auvézère running through the Grotte de Tourtoirac rises in Loqueyssie in Granges d'Ans

Famous people 
 Georges Johnston (1773–1844), Landowner of Scottish extraction and Captain in Napoleonic army (aide de camp of General Andre Briche. Father of Georges de Peyrebrune
 Joseph Lachaud de Loqueyssie, French politician married in Granges d'Ans and became owner of Château de Redon

Public transport
The nearest train stations are Gare de La Bachellerie (9 km) and Gare de Thenon (10 km).  The TER Nouvelle-Aquitaine services of SNCF connect directly with Bordeaux and Brive.

A bus service from Perigueux operated by Transperigord serves Hautefort.

Adjacent to the La Bachellerie junction of the A89 autoroute is an area for ride sharing ("Aire de covoiturage Chasselines")

The INSEE statistics report that none of the working population utilise public transport for work (75% use car or other vehicle and 25% report no transport or foot).

See also
Communes of the Dordogne department

References

Communes of Dordogne